Confessions publiques (Public confessions) is the third live album by French rocker Alain Bashung, issued in 1995 on Barclay Records. A live video album of the same name, recorded on the 3rd and 4 October 1995 at the Chabada in Angers was also released on VHS and DVD on PolyGram Video.

Reception
French magazine Les Inrocks wrote positively about the album, claiming that it's "a live album on which the songs loosen their ties and take back their freedom", and conclude that the album is an "elegant stopgap in a sometimes wind-broken discography".

Track listing

References 

1995 live albums
Barclay (record label) live albums
Alain Bashung albums